Gnome Subtitles is an open-source subtitle editor for
the GNOME desktop, based on Mono. It supports the most common text-based subtitle formats, video previewing, timings synchronization and subtitle translation.

Gnome Subtitles is free software released under the GNU General Public License.

Features 

Gnome Subtitles supports popular subtitle formats, such as SubStation Alpha (and also Advanced SubStation Alpha), SubRip and MicroDVD.

It has a WYSIWYG user interface, supporting emphasis (bold, italic and underline styles) and multi-level undo/redo. Gnome subtitles can also perform timing operations, edit subtitle headers and deal with subtitle's encoding automatically.

Video previewing, time shifts, encoding selection and subtitle merge/split have been added in the newer versions.

Similar programs are Aegisub, Jubler, Subtitle Editor, Gaupol, etc.

See also
 Subtitle editor
 Comparison of subtitle editors

References

External links 

 
 Gnome Subtitles at GNOME GitLab

GNOME Applications
Subtitling
Video software that uses GTK
Free software programmed in C Sharp
Software that uses Mono (software)